Ajith is a 2014 Indian Kannada-language romantic action film directed by Mahesh Babu starring Chiranjeevi Sarja and Nikki Galrani. It is a remake of the Tamil film Paiyaa. G Prem is the producer of this film with five songs in the music direction of Yuvan Shankar Raja.

The film got released across Karnataka cinema halls on 9 May 2014.

Plot
In Bangalore, Ajith, an unemployed young graduate meets Charulatha and falls in love with her. One day, Charulatha tells Ajith to drop her at her grandmother's house in Mumbai to escape from a forced marriage arranged by her father. During the journey, the duo encounter two gangs after them (one after Ajith and the other gang after Charulatha) for their personal reasons, but Ajith manages to defeat the gangs and unites with Charulatha, who has also fallen in love with him.

Cast
 Chiranjeevi Sarja as Ajith
 Nikki Galrani as Charulatha
Arpitha
Vidya 
Vijayanand 
Chandan Naik 
Harish babu 
Anand
Rockline Sudhakar
Shivamanju

Production
The rights of the film were sold to makers in Kannada for approx . While it was earlier said that Purushotham, of Modalasala fame, would helm the project, Mahesh Babu, whose last directorial outing was the Prem-starrer Prem Adda, was confirmed to direct Ajith. Mahesh Babu zeroed in on Nikki Galrani, actress Sanjjanaa's sister as the heroine. The film was launched in January 2013. The shooting began from 12 February 2013. An action shoot was held in Ravi Verma's stunt direction at Hesaraghatta for which Vice Camera was used that gives 1000 frames for an action portion. The shooting was continued in Mysore, going on in Gandhi Square, which is located at the heart of the city. In June the shoot for the songs of the film happened in Bangalore.

Soundtrack
Yuvan Shankar Raja who scored the music for Paiyaa composes the songs of Ajith. All tunes from the original Tamil soundtrack are reused for the Kannada version. The audio was launched on 16 January 2014.

Reception

Critical response 

Shashiprasad S M from Deccan Chronicle wrote "For Chiranjeevi Sarja, who is still cherishing the success of his previous release Chandralekha, the replica is bound to be an average performer. Will Ajith express his love for a happy ending? Simply avoid if you have watched ‘Paiyaa’". B S Srivani from Deccan Herald wrote "However, a loose thought refuses to go away throughout the film and long after people have left the hall: Would a dubbed Paiyya have saved all the expenses in making this film? Of course, watching suave and earnest Karthi contorting his mouth while someone else’s voice is saying something else would be a little squirm-weird". A critic from Sify.com wrote "Chiranjeevi Sarja's run of the mill performance is clearly visible and nothing exciting. Debutante Nikki Galrani needs to polish her acting skills before she tries her hands on the next project. Though the story is not new, director Mahesh Babu could have made it interesting, only if he had added certain attention-grabbing elements. Music by Yuvan Shanka Raja is undoubtedly the best for the reason that it has the same tunes as that of the original. Remakes cannot always be a safe bet is what one has to understand through Ajith".

References

External links
 

2014 films
Indian road movies
Indian romantic action films
2014 masala films
2010s road movies
2010s romantic action films
Kannada remakes of Tamil films
2010s Kannada-language films
Films scored by Yuvan Shankar Raja
Films shot in Mysore
Films shot in Bangalore
Films directed by Mahesh Babu (director)